Pacuare-Matina Forest Reserve, is a protected area in Costa Rica, managed under the Caribbean La Amistad Conservation Area, it was created in 1973 by decree 2886-A.

References 

Nature reserves in Costa Rica
Protected areas established in 1973